Sunnyside is a rural locality in the Mackay Region, Queensland, Australia. In the  Sunnyside had a population of 145 people.

History 
Scrubby Mount Provisional School opened circa 1896. On 1 January 1909 it became Scrubby Mount State School. In 1912 it was renamed Sunnyside State School. It closed in 1960.

In the  Sunnyside had a population of 145 people.

Geography
Bells Creek forms much of the eastern boundary. Sarina Homebush Road (State Route 5) follows part of the eastern boundary before passing through from south-east to north-west.

References 

Mackay Region
Localities in Queensland